Glucan endo-1,6-beta-glucosidase (endo-1,6-beta-glucanase, beta-(1->6)-beta-D-glucanase, beta-1,6-glucanase-pustulanase, beta-1,6-glucan hydrolase, beta-1,6-glucan 6-glucanohydrolase, 1,6-beta-D-glucan glucanohydrolase) is an enzyme with systematic name 6-beta-D-glucan glucanohydrolase. This enzyme catalyses the following chemical reaction

 Random hydrolysis of (1->6)-linkages in (1->6)-beta-D-glucans

This enzyme acts on lutean, pustulan and 1,6-oligo-beta-D-glucosides.

References

External links 
 

EC 3.2.1